Paleotullbergia is a genus of springtails in the family Paleotullbergiidae, the sole genus of the family. Its only species is Paleotullbergia primigenia, found in Africa.

References

Further reading

 

Poduromorpha
Springtail genera
Monotypic arthropod genera